Bjerkås is a village in Asker municipality, Norway.

Villages in Akershus